Andreas Lorentz Kron (born 1 June 1998) is a Danish professional racing cyclist, who currently rides for UCI WorldTeam .

Major results

2015
 7th Overall Keizer der Juniores
2016
 1st  Overall GP Gènèral Patton
1st Stage 1
 1st  Overall Keizer der Juniores
 9th Overall Grand Prix Rüebliland
2017
 4th Eschborn–Frankfurt Under–23
 6th Ghent–Wevelgem U23
2018
 4th Ghent–Wevelgem U23
 4th Overall Flèche du Sud
1st Stage 3
2019
 5th Overall Tour of Belgium
 5th Road race, UCI Road World Under–23 Championships
 8th Overall Tour Alsace
2020
 2nd Road race, National Road Championships
 5th Overall Tour de Luxembourg
1st  Young rider classification
1st Stage 5
 8th Overall Tour of Saudi Arabia
1st  Young rider classification
 9th Trofeo Laigueglia
2021
 1st Stage 1 Volta a Catalunya
 1st Stage 6 Tour de Suisse
 5th Tre Valli Varesine
  Combativity award Stage 19 Vuelta a España
2022
 7th Giro della Toscana
 8th Overall Tour des Alpes-Maritimes et du Var
1st  Young rider classification
 8th Coppa Sabatini
 9th Clásica Jaén Paraíso Interior
 9th Veneto Classic
 10th Giro del Veneto
2023
 5th Clásica Jaén Paraíso Interior
 9th Overall Vuelta a Andalucía
 10th Strade Bianche

Grand Tour general classification results timeline

References

External links

1998 births
Living people
Danish male cyclists
People from Albertslund Municipality
Sportspeople from the Capital Region of Denmark
Tour de Suisse stage winners